Ajan Qarah Khvajeh (also Romanized as Ajan Qarah Khvājeh and Ajan Qareh Khvājeh) is a village in Qaravolan Rural District, Loveh District, Galikash County, Golestan Province, Iran. At the 2006 census, its population was 938, in 225 families.

References 

Populated places in Galikash County